Carlos Bielicki (born 15 May 1940) is an Argentine chess master.

In 1958, he won the Argentine Junior Championship. In 1959, Bielicki was World Junior Chess Champion, winning the tournament in Münchenstein and earning the International Master title. In 1960, he took 11th at Mar del Plata (Boris Spassky and Bobby Fischer won). In 1961, he took 7th in Mar del Plata (Miguel Najdorf won). In 1961, he tied for 3rd–5th in the Argentine Chess Championship (Héctor Rossetto won).

External links

1940 births
Living people
Argentine chess players
Chess International Masters
Argentine people of Polish descent
World Junior Chess Champions
Place of birth missing (living people)